MZT may refer to:

 Mercury zinc telluride
 General Rafael Buelna International Airport (IATA Code: MZT) in Mazatlan, Mexico
 An acronym used by the Communist Party of China to describe Mao Zedong Thought
 Maternal to zygotic transition
 Macedonian basketball club KK MZT Skopje